Archeria hirtella is a species of shrub in the family Ericaceae.  It is native to Tasmania, Australia.

Taxonomy
Joseph Hooker first described it in 1847 as Epacris hirtella from a specimen collected in Macquarie Harbour by Gunn, but in 1860 he assigned it to the genus, Archeria.

References

External links
Archeria hirtella occurrence data from Australasian Virtual Herbarium
Archeria hirtella at The Plant List
Archeria hirtella at the Australian Understory Network
Archeria hirtella at the UTAS Key to Tasmanian Vascular Plants

Epacridoideae
Flora of Tasmania
Taxa named by Joseph Dalton Hooker
Plants described in 1847